Daniel Leon-Penaranda is a retired Peruvian-American soccer midfielder who played professionally in the USL A-League.

Born in Peru, Leon spent much of his youth in the United States where he played for Eleftheria Pancyprian.  In 1994, Leon joined the Long Island Rough Riders of the USISL A-League, playing for them until 2003.  From 1997 to 2003, he played 126 league games and scored 22 league goals.  In 2004, he finished his career with the Brooklyn Knights of the USL Premier Development League.

References

Living people
1974 births
American soccer players
Brooklyn Knights players
Long Island Rough Riders players
USL League Two players
A-League (1995–2004) players
Association football midfielders